Richard Watson may refer to:

 Richard Watson (author) (born 1961), English writer and lecturer known for his books on the future
 Richard Watson (bishop of Burnley) (1923–1998), Bishop of Burnley
 Richard Watson (bishop of Llandaff) (1737–1816), Anglican clergyman and academic
 Richard Watson (cricketer) (1921–1987), English cricketer
 Billy Watson (footballer, born 1890), born Richard Watson, English footballer with Burnley and England
 Richard Watson (Methodist) (1781–1833), British Methodist theologian
 Richard Watson (philosopher) (1931–2019), American philosopher, speleologist and author
 Richard Watson (politician) (1800–1852), British Member of Parliament for Canterbury and Peterborough
 Richard Watson (singer) (1903–1968), actor and singer, especially with D'Oyly Carte Opera Company
 Richard S. Watson (1902–1987), bishop of the Episcopal Diocese of Utah
 Richard J. Watson (B. 1946), American artist